Somali Fruit football club is an African football club, based in Somalia. Mogadiscio Stadium is their home stadium. They currently play in the Somalia League the top division of Somali football.

References

External links

Football clubs in Somalia
Sport in Mogadishu
Works association football teams